Marlon Santos da Silva Barbosa (born 7 September 1995), known as Marlon or Marlon Santos, is a Brazilian professional footballer who plays as a centre-back for  club Monza, on loan from Shakhtar Donetsk.

Club career

Fluminense
Marlon joined the Fluminense academy at the age of 14; after progressing through the youth ranks, in 2014 he made his debut for Fluminense at the age of 18, in the Campeonato Brasileiro Série A, versus São Paulo in a 5–2 victory. Marlon ended his first season with 20 league appearances, and played twice in the Copa Sudamericana.

Having missed the first part of the 2015 season due to international duty with Brazil U20, Marlon returned for the second half where he played as a starter for Fluminense. He played 24 games in the league.

Barcelona
On 8 June 2016, Marlon signed for Barcelona on a season-long loan. He played as a starter for their B team, helping them gain promotion from the Segunda División B (third division) to the Segunda División (second division) with 27 appearances between the regular season and the promotion play-offs.

Marlon made his debut for the first team on 23 November 2016, in a Champions League group stage game against Celtic, coming on as a substitute in the 72nd minute for Gerard Piqué. Marlon's La Liga debut came against Las Palmas on 14 May 2017. After impressing on loan, Barcelona activated Marlon's loan clause from Fluminense for €5 million on a four-year contract.

Nice (loan)
In August 2017, Nice signed Marlon on loan. He made his debut in Ligue 1 against Monaco in a 4–0 win, and played a total of 23 league games. Marlon's loan ended early at the end of the 2017–18 season as manager Patrick Vieira announced that Marlon would no longer form part of his squad.

Sassuolo
On 16 August 2018, Marlon signed for Serie A club Sassuolo for an initial fee of €6 million with a buy-back clause in Barcelona's favour. Upon 50 games played Sassuolo would owe Barcelona another €6 million. Marlon made his debut on matchday 2 against Cagliari; he was sent out for a second yellow card in added time. Nevertheless, he impressed head coach Roberto De Zerbi who fielded him for 15 consecutive games as a starter without subbing him off. He made 18 appearances in the 2018–19 Serie A season, scoring once against Bologna on 28 October.

The following two seasons (2019–20 and 2020–21), Marlon played 47 total games in the league.

Shakhtar Donetsk
On 22 June 2021, Shakhtar Donetsk announced the signing of Marlon on a five-year contract, where he reunited with former Sassuolo coach De Zerbi. He played 12 league games, and helped Shakhtar win the 2021 Ukrainian Super Cup.

Monza (loan)
On 5 August 2022, Marlon returned to Serie A, signing for newly-promoted side Monza for one year. He made his debut on 8 August, in a 3–2 Coppa Italia win against Frosinone.

International career 
Marlon represented Brazil internationally at the under-20 level at the 2015 FIFA U-20 World Cup, helping his side reach the final which they lost after extra time against Serbia. He also played at the 2015 South American U-20 Championship.

Style of play 
Marlon is a centre-back who can play in a back three, either on the left or the right. He is known for his physicality, stamina and heading, and can set up the game from the back with his passing. Serhiy Palkin, CEO of Shakhtar, defined Marlon as "one of the best defenders in Europe technically".

Personal life 
Marlon and his girlfriend Maria have two sons, Pedro and João Miguel Santos.

Career statistics

Honours
Fluminense
 Primeira Liga: 2016

Barcelona
 Copa del Rey: 2016–17

Shakhtar Donetsk
 Ukrainian Super Cup: 2021
Brazil U20

 FIFA U-20 World Cup runner-up: 2015

References

External links
 
 Profile at A.C. Monza 
 Marlon at playmakerstats.com (English version of ogol.com.br)

1995 births
Living people
Sportspeople from Rio de Janeiro (state)
Brazilian footballers
Association football central defenders
Fluminense FC players
FC Barcelona Atlètic players
FC Barcelona players
OGC Nice players
U.S. Sassuolo Calcio players
FC Shakhtar Donetsk players
A.C. Monza players
Campeonato Brasileiro Série A players
Segunda División B players
La Liga players
Serie A players
Ligue 1 players
Ukrainian Premier League players
Brazilian expatriate footballers
Brazilian expatriate sportspeople in Spain
Brazilian expatriate sportspeople in France
Brazilian expatriate sportspeople in Italy
Brazilian expatriate sportspeople in Ukraine
Expatriate footballers in Spain
Expatriate footballers in France
Expatriate footballers in Italy
Expatriate footballers in Ukraine
Brazil youth international footballers
Brazil under-20 international footballers
2015 South American Youth Football Championship players